Huiyang District (postal: Waiyeung;  is a district of Huizhou, Guangdong province, People's Republic of China.  It was renamed in 2003 amid the restructuring of districts and counties in Huizhou. Formerly named Huiyang city (county level), its size shrank after the restructuring with several towns incorporated into the Huicheng district of Huizhou. Huiyang is the southern urban center of Huizhou along with Huicheng as the northern urban center.

Administrative divisions

Transport
There is a bus service from Huiyang District to Shenzhen Bao'an International Airport in Shenzhen.

Climate

References

County-level divisions of Guangdong
Huizhou